American Dreamer is a 2022 American black comedy film directed by Paul Dektor (in his feature debut) and written by Theodore Melfi. Based on a segment from the radio show This American Life, it stars Peter Dinklage as a professor who tries to buy the estate of a lonely widow played by Shirley MacLaine. Matt Dillon, Danny Glover, Kimberly Quinn, and Danny Pudi also star.

The film premiered at the Tribeca Film Festival on June 11, 2022.

Premise
Dr. Phil Loder, a low-level, adjunct professor of economics at Harvard, has always dreamed of owning a home. His wish becomes a possibility when a lonely widow offers Phil her sprawling estate for pennies. The deal, however, is too good to be true.

Cast
 Peter Dinklage as Dr. Phil Loder
 Shirley MacLaine as Astrid Fanelli, the widow
 Matt Dillon as Dell, a real estate agent
 Danny Glover as a private investigator
 Kimberly Quinn as Maggie
 Danny Pudi as Craig, the Dean of Economics at Brockton University
 Michelle Mylett as a graduate student

Production
The independent film American Dreamer was first announced on February 2, 2021, with Peter Dinklage, Shirley MacLaine, and Kimberly Quinn attached to star. In March, Danny Glover, Matt Dillon, Danny Pudi, and Michelle Mylett joined the cast; production began on March 15 in Vancouver, and was set to conclude on April 16, 2021. Filming also took place in Victoria, British Columbia, where partial parts of the British Columbia Parliament Buildings were converted into "Brockton University" as the film is set in Massachusetts.

Release
The film had its world premiere at the Tribeca Film Festival on June 11, 2022.

References

External links
 

2022 black comedy films
2022 directorial debut films
2022 independent films
2020s English-language films
American black comedy films
American independent films
Films about educators
Films scored by Jeff Russo
Films set in Massachusetts
Films shot in Vancouver
This American Life
2020s American films